Dresden II – Bautzen II is an electoral constituency (German: Wahlkreis) represented in the Bundestag. It elects one member via first-past-the-post voting. Under the current constituency numbering system, it is designated as constituency 160. It is located in central Saxony, comprising the northern and western part of the city of Dresden and a small part of the Bautzen district.

Dresden II – Bautzen II was created for the inaugural 1990 federal election after German reunification. Since 2021, it has been represented by Lars Rohwer of the Christian Democratic Union (CDU).

Geography
Dresden II – Bautzen II is located in central Saxony. As of the 2021 federal election, it comprises the municipalities of Arnsdorf, Großröhrsdorf, Ottendorf-Okrilla, Radeberg, and Wachau from the Bautzen district as well as the entirety of the independent city of Dresden excluding the Ortsamtsbereiche of Altstadt, Blasewitz, Leuben, Plauen, and Prohlis.

History
Dresden II – Bautzen II was created after German reunification in 1990, then known as Dresden II. In the 2002 and 2005 elections, it was named Dresden II – Meißen I. It acquired its current name in the 2009 election. In the 1990 through 1998 elections, it was constituency 319 in the numbering system. In the 2002 through 2009 elections, it was number 161. Since 2013, it has been number 160.

Originally, the constituency comprised the Stadtbezirke of Mitte, Nord, and West from the city of Dresden. In the 2002 and 2005 elections it comprised the municipalities of Coswig, Radebeul, Radeburg, Moritzburg, Niederau, and Weinböhla from the Meißen district, as well as the entirety of the city of Dresden excluding the Stadtbezirke of Altstadt, Blasewitz, Leuben, Plauen, and Prohlis. It acquired its current borders in the 2009 election.

Members
The constituency was first represented by Johannes Nitsch of the Christian Democratic Union (CDU) from 1990 to 1998. Arnold Vaatz was elected in 1998, and re-elected in 2002, 2005, 2009, 2013, and 2017. He was succeeded by Lars Rohwer in 2021.

Election results

2021 election

2017 election

2013 election

2009 election

References

Federal electoral districts in Saxony
1990 establishments in Germany
Constituencies established in 1990
Politics of Dresden
Bautzen (district)